The WSL World Tag Team Championship was a tag team championship in the Wrestling Superstars Live promotion. It was created in 1999 as the AWA Superstars of Wrestling World Tag Team Championship.

Title history

External links
wrestlingsuperstarslive.com

World professional wrestling championships
Tag team wrestling championships
Wrestling Superstars Live